ECHO, Leahy Center for Lake Champlain, formerly the Lake Champlain Basin Science Center, is an  science and nature museum located on the Burlington waterfront in northern Vermont. It is home to more than 70 species of fish, amphibians, invertebrates, and reptiles, major traveling exhibitions, and the Northfield Savings Bank 3D Theater.  ECHO's mission is to inspire and engage families in the joy of scientific discovery, wonder of nature, and care of Lake Champlain. 

ECHO has been open to public since 2003, offering daily animal encounters and hands-on activities that are educational and family-friendly. The Patrick and Marcelle Leahy Center for Lake Champlain is a  campus recognizing Senator Patrick Leahy's dedication to the stewardship of the Lake Champlain Basin. The Leahy Center is also home to the University of Vermont’s Rubenstein School of Environment and Natural Resources, Lake Champlain Basin Program Resource Room, and Lake Champlain Navy Memorial.

ECHO's building is Vermont’s first LEED certified Green Building. It is the only lake aquarium in the United States with this certification. With this designation, ECHO is the third certified building in New England and joins a group of fewer than 70 LEED certified buildings in the United States. The name ECHO originally represented educating and delighting people of all ages about the Ecology, Culture, History and Opportunities for stewardship of the Lake Champlain Basin.

References

External links

Lake Champlain Basin Program

Aquaria in Vermont
Leadership in Energy and Environmental Design certified buildings
Natural history museums in Vermont
Science museums in Vermont
Maritime museums in Vermont
Museums in Burlington, Vermont
Nature centers in Vermont
Museums established in 2003
2003 establishments in Vermont